Karasjok Church is a parish church of the Church of Norway in Karasjok Municipality in Troms og Finnmark county, Norway. It is located in the village of Karasjok. It is the main church for the Karasjok parish which is part of the Indre Finnmark prosti (deanery) in the Diocese of Nord-Hålogaland.

The brown, wooden church was built in 1974 to replace the Old Karasjok Church which was built in 1807. The new church was designed by the architect Odd Østbye and it seats about 500 people. The ground plan is roughly rectangular and all the rooms on the ground level are consolidated under one roof. A low "pitched tent" roof unites with a large ridge turret that has a skylight. The building is clad with vertical panelling. The parish's assembly room, sitting room, offices, and sacristy are located towards the southeast/southwest. Towards the northeast/northwest lies the actual sanctuary room.

Media gallery

See also
List of churches in Nord-Hålogaland

References

Karasjok
Churches in Finnmark
Wooden churches in Norway
20th-century Church of Norway church buildings
Churches completed in 1974
1974 establishments in Norway
Long churches in Norway